The California Kid is a 1974 American made-for-television action thriller film directed by Richard T. Heffron and starring Martin Sheen.

Plot
In 1958, two Navy sailors on leave (one portrayed by Sheen's younger brother, Joe Estevez) are speeding in a 1951 Ford Custom to get back to base on time. When driving through Clarksberg, a town infamous for speed traps, they are pursued at high speed by Sheriff Roy Childress (Vic Morrow), who pushes their car over the edge of a sharp mountain curve with his 1957 Plymouth Belvedere, killing them.

Soon after, a stranger—Michael McCord (Martin Sheen)—arrives in town driving a hot rodded black 1934 Ford three-window coupe, known as "The California Kid". McCord is pulled over by the sheriff for speeding and establishes himself with the sheriff as a hot rodder and potential speed maniac, boasting that his car can do  in 10 seconds. McCord pleads guilty in front of Judge J.A. Hooker (Frederic Downs) and pays the ticket.

McCord later gets coffee at a local diner where the sheriff and judge are also eating. As the sheriff and waitress Maggie (Michelle Phillips) look on, McCord clips a newspaper article, places it on the counter, and leaves the diner. The sheriff sees that the article was about the crash (its headline revealing that the sailors were the sixth and seventh victims of the mountainous curves that year), returns to the station, reviews the accident report, and realizes that McCord shares a last name with one of the sailors.

McCord finds the sailors' wrecked car at the impound yard and sees that its rear bumper was dented by pushbars, seemingly reinforcing his growing suspicion that the crash was not an accident. He also repeatedly drives through the curves at the scene of the crash to test his car's limits, tuning it to better handle the terrain, and learns from Maggie that the sheriff has not been the same since his wife and son were killed by a hit and run driver five years earlier.

Lyle Stafford (Gary Morgan), the younger brother of the town's auto mechanic Buzz Stafford (Nick Nolte), is killed and his girlfriend Sissy (Janit Baldwin) badly injured after the sheriff pursues their 1955 Mercury for speeding and runs it off the same curve as the sailors. Buzz wants to kill the sheriff in revenge, but McCord convinces him to hold off, revealing that one of the sailors was his younger brother. The sheriff, aware that McCord is on to him, orders McCord to leave town, setting the stage for the climactic duel.

On his way out of town, McCord finds the sheriff waiting for him and goads him into giving chase. The sheriff tries to run him off the road, but McCord is ready, having driven his car through the curves multiple times to find its limit. As Buzz and the sheriff's deputy look on, the sheriff loses control at the same curve as the earlier two crashes and plummets over the cliff, becoming a victim of his own obsession, while McCord slides to a safe stop on the sandy shoulder. Triumphant, McCord drives past the diner and waves at Maggie on his way out of town.

Cast

 Martin Sheen as Michael McCord
 Vic Morrow as Sheriff Roy Childress
 Michelle Philips as Maggie
 Stuart Margolin as Deputy
 Nick Nolte as Buzz Stafford
 Janit Baldwin as Sissy
 Gary Morgan as Lyle Stafford
 Frederic Downs as Judge J.A. Hooker
 Don Mantooth as Jack (as Donald Mantooth)
 Joe Estevez as Don McCord (as Joseph Estevez)
 Britt Leach as Johnny 
 Norman Bartold as Howard 
 Barbara Collentine as Edith
 Michael Richardson as Charley
 Gavan O'Herlihy as Tom 
 Jack McCulloch as Pete 
 Ken Johnson as Harlie
 Sandy Brown Wyeth as Leona 
 Tren Dolan as Stranger
 Monika Henreid as Gerry

See also
 List of American films of 1974

External links
 
 

1970s teen drama films
1974 television films
1974 films
American auto racing films
American teen drama films
ABC Movie of the Week
Films about automobiles
Films directed by Richard T. Heffron
Films set in 1958
Films set in California
1974 drama films
1970s English-language films
1970s American films